Trottolino is the title character of an Italian humorous comics magazine.

Background 
Trottolino was created in 1952 by Giorgio Rebuffi under the pen name "O'Layne" and was the title character of a comics magazine published between 1952 and 1990. It was the first comics magazine published by Renato Bianconi, a former collaborator of publisher Alpe; released without any marketing hype, it got an immediate commercial success and launched the career of Bianconi as a publisher.

The comics magazine, similar in its digest-sized format to Topolino, featured the adventures of an anthropomorphic squirrel.  His sidekick in many stories was the anthropomorphic duck Papy Papero, a character created by Luciano Bottaro who was also the leading character of independent stories and later of a western-themed spin-off comic book series, Papys Bill.  The magazine also included comics featuring different characters created by the same Rebuffi, Nicola Del Principe (who later also cured, for several decades, the stories of Trottolino), Giovan Battista Carpi, Luciano Gatto, Tiberio Colantuoni. From 1982 until the end of publications, it stopped the release of original comics and just republished old stories.
 
Several spin-off magazines were published, notably between 1959 and 1978 Super Trottolino and between 1980 and 1983 Gran Trottolino; they substantially were collections of old stories already published in the main publication.

References 

Italian comics characters
Italian comics titles
Comics characters introduced in 1952
Mascots introduced in 1952
1952 comics debuts
Magazines established in 1952
Magazines disestablished in 1990
Children's magazines published in Italy
Comics magazines published in Italy
Italian-language magazines
Defunct magazines published in Italy
1952 establishments in Italy
1990 disestablishments in Italy
Fictional squirrels
Magazine mascots
Male characters in comics
Male characters in advertising
Comics about animals
Comics about ducks
Humor comics
Adventure comics